Paul Nash (born 20 January 1947) is a South African sprinter who tied the 100-metre world record four times in 1968 with a time of 10.0 seconds. He attended Michaelhouse school in the province of KwaZulu-Natal, South Africa.

His most celebrated race in South Africa occurred on 2 April 1968 when at the Krugersdorp stadium he equalled what was then the world record of 10.00.   He was ranked third in the world over 100-metre behind Jim Hines of the United States and Lennox Miller of Jamaica by Track and Field News in 1968.  Hines won the Olympic title at high altitude in Mexico City in 1968 in a world record electronic time of 9.95 with Miller second.

In 1967 Nash had competed against Hines in Los Angeles when he finished third in a hand-timed 10.4 with Hines in 10.2.

The next year Nash, aged 21, was in fine form and during the South African athletics season in the early months of 1968 media attention focussed intensively on Nash's prospects of breaking the world handtimed record of 10.0.   A specially constituted athletics meeting was held on 2 April 1968 at the Krugersdorp stadium located 20 km to the west of Johannesburg (subsequently renamed the [Bob van Reenan] which was run down by Kaiser Chiefs football club and is now standing in ruins ( on the west the Johannesburg to allow Nash another opportunity to challenge the record.

Conditions were not ideal for sprinting on the cinder track then laid at the stadium as it had rained in the afternoon.   Nash's record attempt nevertheless generated great excitement and approximately 16,000 people crowded into the stadium to watch Nash run.  The stadium was so crowded that the announcer was compelled to ask spectators to move their feet from the outer perimeter of the track.

Nash ran 10.0 to equal the record and in July 1968 he recorded an unprecedented sprint double of 10.0 for the 100 metres and 20.1 in the 200 metres within an hour in Zurich.  Shortly thereafter, he suffered a complete breakdown of his health and ability to train and compete as a result of what has subsequently been diagnosed as reactive arthritis, a condition which attacks young people under stress impairing their immune systems.

Despite being offered numerous athletics scholarships to various United States Colleges, the strongly independent-minded Nash chose instead to enroll for a Bachelor of Commerce degree at the University of Witwatersrand in Johannesburg.   After graduating, he channelled the focus that enabled him to equal the world record into the family business and has had a successful and varied career in commerce. He is now chairman of Sable Holding Pty Limited, a property investment and management company, and has also amongst other things operated an aviation company, Astro Helicopters and a road-freight business.

Sportswriter, coach and former Springbok athlete, Jan Barnard, and Nash himself interviewed in early 2011, believe that had he been given the opportunity, but for the sports boycott of South Africa because of its apartheid policies, that he would have beaten Jim Hines in the Olympic final in Mexico City in 1968.

External links 

 
 "Invitation withdrawn", Time, 3 May 1968.
 [J. Barnard, 1968 South African Athletics Annual]
 "", R Mayer, "Arthritis halts 60s speedster at peak of career", Sunday Times, 10 April 2011.

References 

South African male sprinters
Living people
1947 births
Alumni of Michaelhouse
20th-century South African people
21st-century South African people